Malcolm Mowbray (born 1949) is a British screenwriter and television and film director.

Mowbray began his career in television, directing episodes of Premiere, BBC2 Playhouse, and Objects of Affection. In 1984 he turned to feature films with A Private Function, which he directed and co-wrote with Alan Bennett, with whom he shared the Evening Standard British Film Award for Best Screenplay. Additional credits include Crocodile Shoes, Out Cold, Cadfael, Pie in the Sky, Don't Tell Her It's Me, Sweet Revenge, and Monsignor Renard.

References

External links

British film directors
British male screenwriters
British television directors
1949 births
Living people